Defiant may refer to:

In the Star Trek universe 
 Defiant (Star Trek: Deep Space Nine), an episode of the series Star Trek: Deep Space Nine
 USS Defiant, a starship in Star Trek: Deep Space Nine and in the film Star Trek: First Contact
 USS Defiant (NCC-1764), sister ship to the Enterprise in the Star Trek: The Original Series episode "The Tholian Web"

Transportation 
 Boulton Paul Defiant, a British fighter aircraft of World War 2
 Defiant 300, a prototype aircraft of the Philippines
 GWR 4073 Class 5080 Defiant, a Great Western Railway locomotive
 Rutan Defiant, an aircraft designed by Burt Rutan
 , a Valiant-class tugboat launched 2010
 Sikorsky–Boeing SB-1 Defiant, an American compound helicopter

Other uses 
 Defiant, a 2006 album by Vice Squad
 Defiant (G.I. Joe), a fictional space shuttle complex in the toy line G.I. Joe: A Real American Hero
 Defiant Comics, a comic book publishing imprint
 Defiant Theatre, an American theatre company based in Chicago
 H.M.S. Defiant, a 1962 film
 The Defiant, a World War II memoir by Shalom Yoran
 The Sandpit Generals, a 1971 American film also released as The Defiant
 Toronto Defiant, a Canadian esports team

See also
 Defiance (disambiguation)
 Defy (disambiguation)
 Disobedience